Kharina is a rural locality (a village) in Stepanovskoye Rural Settlement, Kudymkarsky District, Perm Krai, Russia. The population was 126 as of 2010. There are 9 streets.

Geography 
Kharina is located 8 km east of Kudymkar (the district's administrative centre) by road. Lopatina is the nearest rural locality.

References 

Rural localities in Kudymkarsky District